The Portsmouth School Department is a school district in Portsmouth, Rhode Island, United States.

Administration 
The superintendent is Thomas W. Kentworthy. He has been superintendent since January 2020. Before being appointed, Dr. Kentworthy served as the assistant superintendent. Before coming to Portsmouth, he was a principal at North Kingstown High School, a principal and an assistant principal in Cumberland Public Schools, an educational specialist for the Rhode Island Department of Education, and a social studies teacher at North Kingstown High School.

School Committee 
There are seven members of the Portsmouth School Committee. All members of the Committee are elected.

 Emily Copeland, Chair
 Juan Carlos Payero, Vice Chair
 Karen McDaid, Clerk
 Sondra Blank
 Frederick Faerber III
 Isabelle Kelly
 Emily Skeehan

Schools 
 Portsmouth High School
 Portsmouth Middle School
 Howard Hathaway Elementary School
 Melville Elementary School

References

External links
 Portsmouth School Department

Portsmouth, Rhode Island
School districts in Rhode Island
Education in Newport County, Rhode Island